Perfect Timing is the sixth studio album by American hip-hop group Outlawz, consisting of members Hussein Fatal, Young Noble and E.D.I. Perfect Timing missed its original March 2011 release date and was finally released on September 13, 2011, the fifteenth anniversary of 2Pac's death.

Track listing

References

External links 
 
 

2011 albums
Albums produced by Aone
Albums produced by Cozmo
Albums produced by Focus...
Albums produced by Aone Beats
Albums produced by Maxwell Smart (record producer)
Outlawz albums
Gangsta rap albums by American artists